San Sebastián Tecomaxtlahuaca is a town and municipality in Oaxaca in south-western Mexico. The municipality covers an area of 369.99 km² and is part of the Juxtlahuaca District of the Mixteca Region.

As of 2005, the municipality had a total population of 6,916.

References

Municipalities of Oaxaca